Grifola is a genus of fungi in the family Meripilaceae, which includes some edible fungi such as Grifola frondosa, commonly known as hen-of-the-woods (or maitake in Japan); not to be confused with Laetiporus sulphureus, known among English speakers as chicken of the woods. The genus was circumscribed by Samuel Frederick Gray in 1821.

References

External links

Meripilaceae
Polyporales genera
Fungi described in 1821
Taxa named by Samuel Frederick Gray